Oblivion is Orphanage's first album, released in March 1995 by DSFA Records. The CD features 10 tracks that have been recorded, mixed and mastered in Raamsdonkveer.

Track listing
All songs written by Orphanage, except where noted.
 Chameleon - 05:13
 Weltschmerz - 05:34
 The Case of Charles Dexter Ward - 04:13
 In the Garden of Eden - 05:39
 Journey into the Unknown - 04:30
 Druid - 03:07
 Veils of Blood - 04:35 (Eikens, Vogelaar, J. Siteur)
 Sea of Dreams - 03:50
 The Collector - 02:25
 Victim of Fear - 05:57

Personnel
As noted in liner.
Martine Van Loon: Clean Vocals
George Oostboek: Growls, Screams and Death Vocals
Lex Vogelaar: Rhythm, Lead and Acoustic Guitars, Backing Vocals
Guus Eikens: Keyboards, Backing Vocals
Eric Hoogendoorn: Bass
Jules Vlengels: Drums

Production
Executive Producer: Anthony Vd Berg
Arranged, Produced, Mixed and Edited by Lex Vogelaar
Recording Engineers: Wilbert Montens, Tom Brouwens and Stephen van Haestregt

1995 albums
Orphanage (band) albums